Caligus is a genus of sea lice in the family Caligidae. The species are parasites of marine fishes and could be vectors of viruses. , the World Register of Marine Species includes the following species:

Caligus absens Ho, Lin & Chen, 2000
Caligus acanthopagri Lin, Ho & Chen, 1994
Caligus aduncus Shen & Li, 1959
Caligus aesopus C. B. Wilson, 1921
Caligus affinis Heller, 1866
Caligus afurcatus C. B. Wilson, 1913
Caligus alaihi A. G. Lewis, 1968

Caligus amblygenitalis Pillai, 1961
Caligus antennatus Boxshall & Gurney, 1980

Caligus apodus (Brian, 1924)
Caligus arii Bassett-Smith, 1898
Caligus ariicolus C. B. Wilson, 1928
Caligus asperimanus Pearse, 1951
Caligus asymmetricus Kabata, v
Caligus atromaculatus C. B. Wilson, 1913
Caligus balistae Steenstrup & Lütken, 1861
Caligus belones Krøyer, 1863

Caligus berychis C. B. Wilson, 1935
Caligus biaculeatus Brian, 1914
Caligus bicycletus Heegaard, 1945
Caligus bifurcus Shen, 1958
Caligus biseriodentatus Shen, 1957
Caligus bocki Heegaard, 1943
Caligus bonito C. B. Wilson, 1905
Caligus brevicaudatus A. Scott, 1901
Caligus brevicaudus Pillai, 1963
Caligus brevipedis Bassett-Smith, 1896
Caligus brevis Shiino, 1954
Caligus buechlerae Hewitt, 1964
Caligus callaoensis Duran, 1980
Caligus callyodoni Prabha & Pillai, 1986
Caligus calotomi Shiino, 1954
Caligus carangis Krøyer, 1863

Caligus centrodonti Baird, 1850
Caligus chamelensis 
Caligus cheilodactyli Krøyer, 1863
Caligus chelifer C. B. Wilson, 1905
Caligus chiastos Lin & Ho, 2003
Caligus chorinemi Krøyer, 1863
Caligus chrysophrysi Pillai, 1985
Caligus clavatus Kirtisinghe, 1964
Caligus clemensi Parker & Margolis, 1964
Caligus confusus Pillai, 1961
Caligus constrictus Heller, 1865
Caligus cookeoli Ho & Lin, 2010
Caligus cordiventris Shiino, 1952
Caligus cordyla Pillai, 1963
Caligus cornutus Heegaard, 1962
Caligus coryphaenae Steenstrup & Lütken, 1861
Caligus cossacki Bassett-Smith, 1898
Caligus costatus Shen & Li, 1959
Caligus cresseyorum Kabata, 1992
Caligus crusmae Castro-Romero & Baeza-Kuroki, 1982
Caligus cunicephalus Gnanamuthu, 1950
Caligus curtus O. F. Müller, 1785
Caligus cybii Bassett-Smith, 1898
Caligus dactylopteni Uma Devi & Shyamasundari, 1981
Caligus dakari Beneden, 1892
Caligus dampieri Byrnes T., 1987
Caligus dasyaticus Rangnekar, 1957
Caligus debueni Stuardo & Fagetti, 1961
Caligus deformis Brian, 1924
Caligus diaphanus von Nordmann, 1832
Caligus dicentrarchi Cabral & Raibaut, 1986
Caligus dieuzeidei Brian, 1933
Caligus digitatus Ho & Lin, 2003
Caligus dubius T. Scott, 1894
Caligus eleutheronemi Shen, 1957
Caligus elongatus von Nordmann, 1832
Caligus engraulidis Barnard, 1948
Caligus enormis C. B. Wilson, 1913
Caligus epidemicus Hewitt, 1971
Caligus epinepheli Yamaguti, 1936
Caligus equulae Ho & Lin, 2003
Caligus evelynae Suárez-Morales, Camisotti & Martín, 2012
Caligus eventilis Leigh-Sharpe, 1934
Caligus fistulariae Yamaguti, 1936
Caligus flexispina A. G. Lewis, 1964
Caligus fortis Kabata, 1965
Caligus fronsuganinus Shen, 1940
Caligus fugu (Yamaguti, 1936)
Caligus furcisetifer Redkar, Rangnekar & Murti, 1949
Caligus glacialis Gadd, 1910
Caligus glandifer Shiino, 1954

Caligus grandiabdominalis Yamaguti, 1954
Caligus guerini Guiart, 1913
Caligus gurnardi Krøyer, 1863
Caligus haemulonis Krøyer, 1863
Caligus hamatus Heegaard, 1955
Caligus hamruri Pillai, 1964
Caligus hemiconiati Capart, 1941
Caligus hobsoni Cressey, 1969
Caligus hoplognathi Yamaguti & Yamasu, 1959
Caligus hottentotus Barnard, 1957
Caligus hyalinae Heegaard, 1966
Caligus hyalinus Czerniavski, 1868
Caligus ignotus Ho & Lin, 2010
Caligus ilhoikimi Caligus inanis Ho & Lin, 2007Caligus infestans Heller, 1865Caligus inopinatus Kabata, 1994Caligus irritans Heller, 1865Caligus isonyx Steenstrup & Lütken, 1861Caligus itacurussensis Luque & Cezar, 2000Caligus jawahari Hameed & Adamkutty, 1985Caligus kabatae Cressey, 1991Caligus kahawai Jones J.B., 1988Caligus kala A. G. Lewis, 1964Caligus kalumai A. G. Lewis, 1964Caligus kanagurta Pillai, 1961Caligus kapuhili A. G. Lewis, 1967Caligus keralensis Özak, Demirkale, Boxshall & Etyemez, 2013Caligus kirti Prabha & Pillai, 1986Caligus klawei Shiino, 1959Caligus kurochkini Kazachenko, 1975Caligus kuwaitensis Kabata & Tareen, 1984Caligus labracis T. Scott, 1902Caligus lacustris Steenstrup & Lütken, 1861Caligus lagocephali Pillai, 1961Caligus lalandei Barnard, 1948Caligus laminatus (Rangnekar, 1955)Caligus laticaudus Shiino, 1960Caligus latigenitalis Shiino, 1954Caligus latus Byrnes T., 1987Caligus lessonius Risso, 1826Caligus lethrinicola Boxshall & El-Rashidy, 2009Caligus lichiae Brian, 1906Caligus ligatus A. G. Lewis, 1964Caligus ligusticus Brian, 1906Caligus lini 
Caligus littoralis Luque & Cezar, 2000
Caligus lobodes (C. B. Wilson, 1911)
Caligus lolligunculae Capart, 1941
Caligus longiabdominis Shiino, 1965
Caligus longicaudatus Brady, 1899
Caligus longicaudus Bassett-Smith, 1898
Caligus longipedis Bassett-Smith, 1898
Caligus longipes 
Caligus longiramus Venmathi Maran, Ohtsuka & Jitchum, 2012
Caligus longirostris Heegaard, 1962
Caligus longispinosus (Heegaard, 1962)
Caligus lunatus C. B. Wilson, 1924
Caligus lutjani Ho, Lin & Chang, 2007
Caligus macarovi Gusev, 1951
Caligus macoloricola Hayes, Justine & Boxshall, 2012
Caligus macrurus Caligus malabaricus Pillai, 1961Caligus mebachii 
Caligus minimus Otto, 1821
Caligus mordax Leigh-Sharpe, 1934
Caligus mortis Kensley, 1970
Caligus mugilis Brian, 1935
Caligus musaicus Cavaleiro, Santos & Ho, 2010
Caligus mutabilis C. B. Wilson, 1905
Caligus nanhaiensis Wu & Pan, 1997
Caligus nengai Rangnekar, Rangnekar & Murti, 1953
Caligus nibeae Caligus nolani Longshaw, 1997Caligus novocaledonicus Kabata, 1968Caligus nuenonnae Andrews, Bott, Battaglene & Nowak, 2009Caligus oculicola Tang & Newbound, 2004Caligus ocyurus Cressey, 1991Caligus ogawai Venmathi Maran, Ohtsuka & Shang, 2012Caligus olsoni Pearse, 1953Caligus omissus Cressey & Cressey, 1980Caligus orientalis Gusev, 1951Caligus oviceps Shiino, 1952Caligus pagelli Delamare Deboutteville & Nunes-Ruivo, 1958Caligus pageti Russell, 1925Caligus pagri Capart, 1941Caligus pagrosomi Yamaguti, 1939Caligus pampi Ho & Lin, 2002Caligus parvilatus I. H. Kim, 1998Caligus parvus Bassett-Smith, 1898Caligus patulus C. B. Wilson, 1937Caligus pauliani Nuñes-Ruivo & Fourmanoir, 1956Caligus pectinatus Shiino, 1965Caligus pelagicus Kurian, 1955Caligus pelamydis Krøyer, 1863Caligus penrithi Kensley & Grindley, 1973Caligus pharaonis 
Caligus phipsoni Bassett-Smith, 1898
Caligus placidus Dana, 1849
Caligus planktonis Pillai, 1985
Caligus platurus Kirtisinghe, 1964
Caligus platytarsis Bassett-Smith, 1898
Caligus polycanthi Gnanamuthu, 1950
Caligus pomacentrus Cressey, 1991
Caligus pomadasi Prabha & Pillai, 1986
Caligus praecinctorius Hayes, Justine & Boxshall, 2012
Caligus praetextus Bere, 1936
Caligus priacanthi Pillai, 1961
Caligus productus Dana, 1852
Caligus pseudokalumai A. G. Lewis, 1968
Caligus pseudoproductus Capart, 1959
Caligus pterois Kurian, 1949
Caligus punctatus Shiino, 1955
Caligus quadratus Shiino, 1954
Caligus quadrigenitalis Venmathi Maran, Ohtsuka & Shang, 2012
Caligus randalli A. G. Lewis, 1964
Caligus raniceps Heegaard, 1943
Caligus rapax Milne Edwards, 1840
Caligus regalis Leigh-Sharpe, 1930
Caligus reniformis Prabha & Pillai, 1983

Caligus robustus Bassett-Smith, 1898
Caligus rogercresseyi Boxshall & Bravo, 2000
Caligus rotundigenitalis Yü, 1933
Caligus rufimaculatus C. B. Wilson, 1905
Caligus saucius Dojiri, 1989
Caligus savala Gnanamuthu, 1948

Caligus schistonyx C. B. Wilson, 1905
Caligus sciaenops Pearse, 1952
Caligus sclerotinosus Roubal, Armitage & Rohde, 1983
Caligus scribae Essafi, Cabral & Raibaut, 1984
Caligus sensorius Heegaard, 1962
Caligus sepetibensis Luque & Takemoto, 1996
Caligus seriolae Yamaguti, 1936
Caligus serratus Shiino, 1965
Caligus sibogae Boxshall & Gurney, 1980
Caligus sicarius Kabata, 1984
Caligus similis Ho, I. H. Kim & Nagasawa, 2005
Caligus solea Caligus spinosus Yamaguti, 1939Caligus stocki Caligus stokesi Byrnes T., 1987Caligus stromatei Krøyer, 1863Caligus subparvus (Hameed, 1977)Caligus suffuscus C. B. Wilson, 1913Caligus tanago Yamaguti, 1939Caligus temnodontis Brian, 1924Caligus tenax Heller, 1865Caligus tenuicauda (Shiino, 1964)Caligus tenuifurcatus C. B. Wilson, 1937Caligus tenuis Fowler, 1912Caligus tenuis Caligus teres C. B. Wilson, 1905Caligus tetrodontis Barnard, 1948Caligus thyrsitae Kazachenko, Korotaeva & Kurochkin, 1972Caligus torpedinis Heller, 1865Caligus trachynoti Heller, 1865Caligus triabdominalis Byrnes T., 1987Caligus triangularis Shiino, 1954Caligus tripedalis Heegaard, 1972Caligus truttae Giard, 1890Caligus tylosuri (Rangnekar, 1956)Caligus undulatus Shen & Li, 1959Caligus uniartus (Ho, I. H. Kim, Cruz & Nagasawa, 2004)Caligus ventrosetosus Pearse, 1952Caligus vexator Heller, 1865Caligus willungae Kabata, 1965Caligus wilsoni Delamare Deboutteville & Nunes-Ruivo, 1958Caligus xystercus Cressey, 1991Caligus zei Norman & T. Scott, 1906Caligus zylanica'' Hameed & Pillai, 1986

References

Siphonostomatoida
Copepod genera
Taxa named by Otto Friedrich Müller